Poullan-sur-Mer (literally Poullan on Sea) is a commune in the Finistère department of Brittany in north-western France.

Population
Inhabitants of Poullan-sur-Mer are called in French Poulannais.

See also
Communes of the Finistère department

References

External links

Mayors of Finistère Association 

Communes of Finistère
Populated coastal places in France